The women's individual sabre competition at the 2014 Asian Games in Goyang was held on 20 September at the Goyang Gymnasium.

Schedule
All times are Korea Standard Time (UTC+09:00)

Results 
Legend
WO — Won by walkover

Preliminaries

Pool A

Pool B

Pool C

Summary

Knockout round

Final standing

References
Women's Individual Sabre Results

External links
Official website

Women sabre